Yelanlino (Yılanlı) is a rural locality (a selo) and the administrative centre of Yelanlinsky Selsoviet, Kiginsky District, Bashkortostan, Russia. The population was 796 as of 2010. There are 11 streets.

Geography 
Yelanlino is located 32 km south of Verkhniye Kigi (the district's administrative centre) by road. Lakly is the nearest rural locality.

References 

Rural localities in Kiginsky District